Mosermandl (2,680 m) is a mountain of the Radstadt Tauern in Salzburg, Austria. 

One of the main peaks of the Radstadt Tauern, Mosermandl is a limestone mountain topped with a karst plateau. It is usually climbed from the southern Zederhaus side and provides fine views towards the High Tauern towards the south and west.

References

Mountains of the Alps
Mountains of Salzburg (state)
Two-thousanders of Austria
Radstadt Tauern